Actinopus pertyi is a species of mygalomorph spiders in the family Actinopodidae. It is found in South America.

References

pertyi
Spiders described in 1843